Fotballklubben Fauske/Sprint is a Norwegian association football club from Fauske, Nordland.

It was founded on 25 April 1937.

The men's football team currently plays in the Third Division, the fourth tier of Norwegian football. It last played in the Norwegian Second Division in 2001.  After the 2006 season it contested a playoff to win re-promotion, but failed. The women's soccer team plays in the third division.

References

 Official site

External links
 SKS Arena - Nordic Stadiums

Football clubs in Norway
Sport in Nordland
Association football clubs established in 1937
1937 establishments in Norway